Education Ecosystem (LEDU) is a project-based learning platform that teaches its users how to build products in areas such as programming, game development, artificial intelligence, cybersecurity, data science, and blockchain. In 2018, the company completed and closed a $10 million token crowdfunding to build new projects on its platform that is available for transactions with education coin (LEDU).

Overview
Education Ecosystem is a decentralized learning ecosystem for online education and professional development that intends to teach people how to build complete products in future technological fields and to improve their job skills. Their ecosystem consists of two networks, the internal ecosystem and the external ecosystem. The former consists of project creators, viewers, community moderators, project quality moderators and API application developers. The latter consists of various education companies, colleges, and adult education non-profits. The platform is free for consumers and monetizes by charging companies for "developer relations as a service" automation.

Education Ecosystem targets people who already have intermediate knowledge of a field. College students and professionals mostly from the US, China, Europe and Brazil can use the service to learn how to build complete products. The service is available either as video or livestream. Through the use of blockchain technology, specifically, Ethereum to incentivize practical learning. The platform rewards content creators and students with LEDU for their contributions to promote the passage of practical knowledge while spearheading cryptocurrency adoption and awareness.

History

2015-2016
LiveEdu was originally founded by Jamie Green & Dr. Michael J. Garbade in 2014 under the name Livecoding.tv. The idea behind LiveEdu was inspired by Garbade playing games on Twitch.tv and developing software in a Linux virtualbox environment. The platform was created with the idea of "Twitch.tv but solely for software engineers to share code". The platform became an educational live streaming site where people code products live in various programming languages such as C, C++ and C#.

LiveEdu received its first round of funding from EU Accelerator EuropeanPioneers and in 2015 it joined startup accelerator Y Combinator. The company garnered media attention after its launch, including mentions in TechCrunch, CNN Money, and Mashable.

2019-present
In 2019, the company rebranded itself as Education Ecosystem, expanded their content topics and shifted to focus on monetizable projects. The company announced a $10 million token crowdfunding starting on "Jan. 15th 2018" with a goal of using proceeds to build 10,000 projects in different languages such as Chinese and Russian.

Funding
In 2018, Education Ecosystem announced that it has raised 10 million and Chris Ji joined as advisor to the board.

References

External links

Companies based in California
American educational websites
Ethereum tokens